Plagiosiphon is a genus of plants in the family Fabaceae.

Species accepted by the Plants of the World Online as of February 2021:
Plagiosiphon discifer 
Plagiosiphon emarginatus 
Plagiosiphon gabonensis 
Plagiosiphon longitubus 
Plagiosiphon multijugus

References

Detarioideae
Fabaceae genera
Taxonomy articles created by Polbot